Fire is the sixth studio album by the Ohio Players and the second released through the Mercury label.

History
Fire is the third of five Ohio Players albums that were also available in quadraphonic (4-channel stereo), released as an 8-track tape in the U.S. and on vinyl in Japan.  DTS Entertainment released the quad mix as a DTS Audio CD in 2001.

The album's lead single "Fire" was serving in the mid-2010s as the theme song to the US television series Hell's Kitchen.  Fire topped both the Billboard Pop Albums chart and the Billboard R&B Albums chart (where it held for five weeks) in early 1975.

Track listing

Personnel
James "Diamond" Williams – drums, chimes, percussion, lead & background vocals
 Billy Beck – piano, organ, Fender Rhodes piano, Clavinet, ARP, percussion, lead & background vocals
Marvin "Merv" Pierce – trumpet, flugelhorn, valve trombone & background vocals
Marshall "Rock" Jones – Fender bass
Leroy "Sugarfoot" Bonner – guitar, percussion, lead & background vocals
Ralph "Pee Wee" Middlebrooks – trumpet, trombone & background vocals
Clarence "Satch" Satchell – baritone sax, tenor sax, soprano sax, flute, percussion, lead & background vocals

Production
Ohio Players – producers 
Barry Mraz, Lee Hulko – engineers 
Jim Ladwig – art director
Len Willis – designer
 Stan Malinowski – photography

Charts

Singles

See also
 List of number-one albums of 1975 (U.S.)
 List of number-one R&B albums of 1975 (U.S.)

References

External links
 Fire at Discogs

1974 albums
Ohio Players albums
Mercury Records albums